David Spicer (born May 31, 1985 in Victoria, British Columbia) is a Canadian rugby union player who plays club rugby for the UBCOB Ravens of the British Columbia Premiership and who is also a member of the Canadian national team. The second Spicer brother to don a national team jersey, Spicer is a centre but can also fill in at fly-half.

Spicer made his debut for Canada on November 13, 2004, in a match against . Spicer moved to Auch Gers in France, a team promoted to the Top 14 in 2007, after the World Cup

Spicer played one successful season in France, and now works as a physician in British Columbia, Canada.

References

External links
 Player profile at rugbyworldcup.com
 Player profile at eurosport.com

1985 births
Canada international rugby union players
Canadian rugby union players
Living people
Sportspeople from Victoria, British Columbia
Rugby union fly-halves